Xylosybra fasciculosa is a species of beetle in the family Cerambycidae, and the only species in the genus Xylosybra. It was described by Stephan von Breuning in 1939.

It's 14½ mm long and 4⅓ mm wide, and its type locality is Sarawak, Borneo.

References

Apomecynini
Beetles described in 1939
Taxa named by Stephan von Breuning (entomologist)
Monotypic beetle genera